Ian James Oppermann from the Commonwealth Scientific & Industrial Research Org. (CSIRO), Sydney, NSW, Australia was named Fellow of the Institute of Electrical and Electronics Engineers (IEEE) in 2012 for contributions to mobile communication systems.

References 

Fellow Members of the IEEE
Living people
Australian electrical engineers
Year of birth missing (living people)